The W. H. Heinemann Award is an award established by William Heinemann who bequeathed funds to the Royal Society of Literature to establish a literary prize, given from 1945 to 2003.

Awards list
1945 A Prospect of Flowers, botanical reminiscences by Andrew Young, poet and vicar of Stonegate in Sussex 
1946 The Garden by Vita Sackville-West
1947 Letters to Malaya by Martyn Skinner
1948 Selected Poems by John Betjeman
1951 Gormenghast and The Glassblowers by Mervyn Peake
1952 The Cruel Sea by Nicholas Monsarrat
1953 Edwin Muir
1954 The Ermine: poems, 1942–1952 by Ruth Pitter (joint winner)
1954 The Go-Between by L.P. Hartley (joint winner)
1955 Song at the Year's Turning by R. S. Thomas
1956 Roman Mornings by James Lees-Milne 
1958 The Chequer'd Shade by John Press
1959 The Devil's Advocate by Morris West
1960 Venice by Jan Morris 
1961 The Masks of Love by Vernon Scannell 
1962 Curmantle by Christopher Fry
1962 The Destruction of Lord Raglan by Christopher Hibbert
1963 Mrs. Browning: A Poet's Work and Its Setting by Alethea Hayter
1964 The Marsh Arabs by Wilfred Thesiger
1965 Journey from Obscurity: Wildred Owen, 1893-1919 by Harold Owen
1966 Wide Sargasso Sea by Jean Rhys 
1967 Charlotte Bronte: The Evolution of Genius by Winifred Gérin
1968 George Eliot: A Biography by Gordon S. Haight
1969 Sir William Hamilton: Envoy Extraordinary by Brian Fothergill
1969 V. S. Pritchett
1970 Britain and Her Army by Corelli Barnett
1971 Granite Island: Portrait of Corsica by Dorothy Carrington
1972 Mercian Hymns by Geoffrey Hill
1973 The Chant of Jimmie Blacksmith by Thomas Keneally
1974 Mooncranker's Gift by Barry Unsworth
1974 Eclipse by Nicholas Wollaston
1975 William Wilberforce by Robin Furneaux	
1976 Angels at the Ritz by William Trevor 
1978 The First Fabians by Norman Ian MacKenzie and Jeanne MacKenzie
1979 Live Bait and Other Stories by Frank Tuohy
1979 Beckford of Fonthill by Brian Fothergill
1980 Moortown by Ted Hughes
1981 Old Glory: An American Voyage by Jonathan Raban
1983 Fortunate Traveller by Derek Walcott
1984 T.S. Eliot: A Life by Peter Ackroyd (joint winner)
1984 Eleni by Nicholas Gage (joint winner)	
1985 Secrets of a Woman's Heart: Later Life of Ivy Compton-Burnett, 1920–69 by Hilary Spurling	
1986 The Blind Watchmaker by Richard Dawkins 
1988 The Russian Album by Michael Ignatieff	
1989 Elizabeth Barrett Browning: A Biography by Margaret Forster	
1990 Short Afternoons by Kit Wright	
1991 Ford Maddox Ford by Alan Judd
1994 The Handless Maiden by Vicki Feaver
1995 Younghusband: The Last Great Imperial Adventurer by Patrick French (joint winner)	
1995 Paul Durcan (joint winner)
1996 The Shadow of Hiroshima and Other Film/Poems by Tony Harrison	
1997 Victor Hugo by Graham Robb
1998 Coleridge: Darker Reflections, 1804–1834 by Richard Holmes
2001 Night of Stone: Death and Memory in Twentieth-Century Russia by Catherine Merridale 
2002 Charles Darwin: The Power of Place by Janet Browne
2003 Primo Levi by Ian Thomson
2004 Power and Glory'' by Adam Nicolson

References

English literary awards
Awards established in 1945
1945 establishments in England
2003 disestablishments in England
British fiction awards
British non-fiction literary awards